Pia Grønning (born 2 November 1949 in Denmark) is a Danish film actress who also performed in Hollywood movies. Her first appearance in a Danish movie was Collective Marriage or Marriage Collectif in 1970. She also appeared in The New Twilight Zone episode, "Dead Woman's Shoes" as Susan Montgomery. She starred in Hosekraemmeren in 1970 in Denmark. She also appeared in Two Jakes in 1990 and in Wild Turkey in 2003, both Hollywood movies.

Filmography

References

External links 
 

1949 births
Living people
Danish film actresses